NGC 6975, also known as NGC 6976, is a spiral galaxy in the constellation Aquarius. The object was discovered on 12 July 1864 by the German astronomer Albert Marth.

NGC 6975 is part of Hickson Compact Group 88, along with NGC 6977, NGC 6978, and MCG-01-53-014. The group is at a distance of about 273 million light years (84 million parsecs). In 2012, supernova SN 2012ga was discovered within NGC 6975.

See also
 List of NGC objects

References 

Aquarius (constellation)
Intermediate spiral galaxies
6975
65620